Laurent Bado is a Burkinabé politician and member of the National Rebirth Party (PAREN).

Political career 
Running as the PAREN candidate in the 13 November 2005 presidential election, Bado placed third out of 13 candidates, receiving 2.60% of the vote.

In the May 2007 parliamentary election, Bado was elected to the National Assembly as a PAREN candidate in Kadiogo Province; he was the only PAREN candidate to win a seat in the election.

In the November 2015 parliamentary election, Bado was again elected to the National Assembly as a PAREN candidate in Kadiogo Province.

References

Living people
Year of birth missing (living people)
Members of the National Assembly of Burkina Faso
National Rebirth Party politicians
People from Centre Region (Burkina Faso)
21st-century Burkinabé people